New Westminster was the name, or part of the name, of several Canadian federal and provincial electoral districts.  All provincial and federal ridings in the area of the Lower Mainland were part of the original New Westminster ridings.  "Off-spring" ridings are indicated accordingly.

Federal

Historical

New Westminster District, 1871-1872
New Westminster (electoral district), 1872-1976
Westminster District, 1914-1919
Fraser Valley, 1919-1966
Fraser Valley East, 1966-1996
Fraser Valley, 1996-2003
Abbotsford, 2003-
Chilliwack—Fraser Canyon. 2003-
Fraser Valley West, 1966-1996
Langley—Matsqui, 1996,1997 (never used; named changed to:)
Langley—Abbotsford, 1997-2003
Abbotsford, 2003-
Langley, 2003-
New Westminster—Coquitlam, 1976-1987
Burnaby, 1976-1987
Burnaby—Kingsway, 1987-1996
Burnaby—Douglas, 1996-2013
New Westminster—Coquitlam—Burnaby, 1996-2003
Burnaby—New Westminster, 2003-2013
New Westminster—Coquitlam, 2003-2013

Current
New Westminster—Burnaby, 1987-1996, 2015-present

Provincial

Historical

New Westminster, 1871-
New Westminster City, 1871-1912

The New Westminster riding originally included all of the Lower Mainland outside of the City of New Westminster, such that all Fraser Valley and Vancouver ridings are derivatives of the New Westminster riding, which became a three-member renamed Westminster for the 1890 election before being partitioned into four ridings.  The following table attempts to trace the lineage of the Lower Mainland ridings (other than those in Vancouver or the North Shore, which can be found on Vancouver (electoral districts):

Westminster 1890 only
Westminster-Chilliwhack 1894-1900
Chilliwhack 
Chilliwack 
Westminster-Delta 1894-1900
Langley 1966-1986
Central Fraser Valley (1979-1986)
Fort Langley-Aldergrove
Abbotsford-Clayburn
Abbotsford-Mount Lehman
Delta 1903-1986
Surrey (1966-1983)
Surrey-Newton (1986-present)
Surrey-Guildford-Whalley (1986 only)
Surrey-White Rock-Cloverdale (1986 only)
Westminster-Dewdney1894-1900
Dewdney 1903-1986
Maple Ridge-Mission (1991-present)
Coquitlam (1966-1975)
Coquitlam-Moody (1979-1986)
Maillardville-Coquitlam (1979-1986)
Coquitlam-Maillardville (1991-present)
Burnaby (provincial electoral district) (1924-1963)
Burnaby-Willingdon (1966-present)
Burnaby-Edmonds (1966-present)
Burnaby North (1966-present)
Westminster-Richmond 1894-1900
Richmond 1903-1920, 1966-1986
Richmond-Point Grey 1924-1928

And all Vancouver, North Vancouver and West Vancouver ridings are "descendants" of the original New Westminster riding.

Current
New Westminster, 1871-

British Columbia electoral districts
Electoral districts of Greater Vancouver and the Fraser Valley
British Columbia politics-related lists